Babesia microti is a parasitic blood-borne piroplasm transmitted by deer ticks.  B. microti is responsible for the disease babesiosis, a malaria-like disease which also causes fever and hemolysis.

Life cycle
The life cycle of B. microti includes human red blood cells and is an important transfusion-transmitted infectious organism.  Between 2010 and 2014 it caused four out of fifteen (27%) fatalities associated with transfusion-transmitted microbial infections reported to the US FDA (the highest of any single organism). In 2018, the FDA approved an antibody-based screening test for blood and organ donors.

An important difference from malaria is that B. microti does not infect liver cells.  Additionally, the piroplasm is spread by tick bites (Ixodes scapularis, the same tick that spreads Lyme disease), while the malaria protozoans are spread via mosquito.  Finally, under the microscope, the merozoite form of the B. microti lifecycle in red blood cells forms a cross-shaped structure, often referred to as a "Maltese cross" or tetrad, in addition to intracellular "ring forms" which are also seen in the malaria parasite (Plasmodium spp.).

Taxonomy

Until 2006 B. microti was thought to belong to the  genus Babesia, as Babesia microti, until ribosomal RNA comparisons placed it in the sister genus Theileria.  , the medical community still classified the parasite as Babesia microti though its genome showed it does not belong to either Babesia or Theileria.

Genomics
The genome of Babesia microti has been sequenced and published. 

The mitochondrial genome is circular.

Vaccine 
In May 2010, it was reported that a vaccine to protect cattle against East Coast fever had been approved and registered by the governments of Kenya, Malawi and Tanzania.

A vaccine to protect humans has yet to be approved.

References

External links 
 Babesia microti  Minnesota Department of Health

Piroplasmida